Kapusta, literally meaning "cabbage" in several Slavic languages, may refer to:

Kapusta kiszona duszona, a Polish dish
NATO reporting name for Soviet communications ship SSV-33
Kapusta class command ship
Kapusta (surname)

See also
Kapustka
Kapust
Kapuska